"Take It to the Limit" is a song by the Eagles from their fourth album One of These Nights from which it was issued as the third single on November 15, 1975. It reached No. 4 on the U.S. Billboard Hot 100 and was also the Eagles' greatest success to that point in the UK, going to No. 12 on the charts. Billboard ranked it as the No. 25 song for 1976.

The song was written by Eagles members Randy Meisner, Don Henley and Glenn Frey. Meisner, who sang lead on it, says the song began as his solo composition. As it remained unfinished when time came for the One of These Nights album to be recorded, Henley and Frey assisted Meisner in completing it.  Meisner's performance of the song was popular with the audience in Eagles concerts, but disputes over his reluctance to perform it would also directly lead to Meisner's departure from the band.

Background
According to Meisner, he wrote the first few lines of the song one night while playing an acoustic guitar after returning from the Troubadour; however he was not able to finish the song by the time they were close to recording it, and Frey and Henley then helped him with the lyrics. Meisner later said of how he would usually write songs with the Eagles: "I'd get a verse or two, and I'm done, and they would help fill in the blanks"

On the meaning of the song, Meisner said in the documentary History of the Eagles: "The line 'take it to the limit' was to keep trying before you reach a point in your life where you feel you've done everything and seen everything, sort of feeling, you know, part of getting old. And just to take it to the limit one more time, like every day just keep, you know, punching away at it ... That was the line, and from there the song took a different course."

Recordings
"Take It to the Limit" is unique in the canon of the band's singles, being the sole A-side on which Randy Meisner sang lead, as well as the first A-side Eagles single on which neither Henley nor Frey sang lead. It was also the last Eagles single to feature founding member Bernie Leadon before he was replaced by guitarist Joe Walsh. The single version of the song is 3:48 in length, almost a minute shorter than the album version. "Take It to the Limit" is one of few Eagles' tracks written in waltz time. (Other notable waltzes performed by the Eagles are "Hollywood Waltz"; the Meisner/Henley/Frey waltz "Saturday Night" (co-written with Leadon) from the 1973 Desperado album; Frey's "Most of Us are Sad" from their self-titled debut album; Frey/Henley/JD Souther's hard-rocking "Teenage Jail" from 1979's "The Long Run" album; and Walsh's "Pretty Maids All in a Row" on the 1976 album Hotel California.)

A live performance by Meisner from 1976 was recorded at The Forum, Inglewood, California. It is included in the album Eagles Live, which was released in 1980 after the band had effectively broken up. A second version, recorded in 1977, was released on ‘Hotel California 40th Anniversary: Expanded Edition’ released in 2017.

The song was rerecorded on Meisner's first solo album (Randy Meisner) released in 1978. The song was performed with piano and acoustic guitar accompaniment, and 1970s teen idol David Cassidy singing in the backing vocals.

Live performances

According to Frey, fans of the band loved Meisner's performance of his signature song "Take It to the Limit" at concert. As Henley puts it: "They went crazy when Randy hit those high notes".  Meisner, however, was concerned about not being able to hit the high notes, but Frey was insistent that Meisner should perform the song in concert for the fans, and live performances of the song then became a source of great contention between Frey and Meisner, and would eventually become one reason for Meisner leaving the band.

Meisner had been struggling to hit the crucial high notes in the song during the Hotel California tour. According to Joe Walsh, Meisner could perform the song, but would become nervous when told he had to sing it. By the time they had reached  Knoxville, Tennessee in June 1977, the band was feeling the strain of a long tour, with Meisner unhappy and suffering from a stomach ulcer.  Meisner decided not to sing the song for an encore because he had been up late and caught the flu.  Frey and Meisner then became involved in an angry physical confrontation backstage over Meisner's refusal to perform the song.  After the altercation, Meisner was frozen out from the band and he decided to leave. He left the band at the end of their tour in September 1977 and was replaced by Timothy B. Schmit, coincidentally the same bassist who had replaced him in Poco.

The song was revived for the Eagles' late 1999 shows at Los Angeles' Staples Center and at those shows, as well as the Eagles' Farewell 1 Tour in 2004 and 2005 and on subsequent tours, the song was sung by Frey. Originally in B major, the song was transposed down to G major to accommodate for Frey's vocal range. For the band's 2017 shows, lead vocals were taken by Vince Gill and was again transposed to A major.

Reception
Billboard described "Take It to the Limit" as "a strong mid -tempo rocker" with "distinctive harmonies" that sounds like the Beach Boys at times.  Cash Box called it "a masterpiece of a background" with "more of the easygoing melodies and lyrics that have made [the Eagles] so hot over their last several releases." Record World said that "The group's harmony sound grows more attractive with each successive listening on this irresistible ballad."

Personnel
Randy Meisner – lead vocals, bass guitar
Glenn Frey – 12-string acoustic guitar, backing vocals
Don Henley – drums, backing vocals
Don Felder – lead guitar
Bernie Leadon – electric guitar
Jim Ed Norman – piano, conductor, string arrangements

Live version from 1976:

Randy Meisner – lead vocals, bass guitar
Glenn Frey – piano, backing vocals
Don Henley – drums, backing vocals
Don Felder – electric guitar, backing vocals
Joe Walsh – 12-string acoustic guitar, backing vocals

Chart performance

Weekly charts

Year-end charts

Certifications

Willie Nelson and Waylon Jennings version

The song was covered by country musicians Willie Nelson and Waylon Jennings as the title track of their duet album, Take It to the Limit, which was released in 1983.

Chart performance

Other versions
 The song was covered in 1977 by Etta James for her album Deep in the Night.
 By Tom Jones on his 1980s television show
 In 1993, Suzy Bogguss recorded the song for the album Common Thread: The Songs of the Eagles.
 Covered by Dave Mason on his album Certified Live 1976

Notes

External links
Webcom.com

1975 singles
1983 singles
1993 singles
1975 songs
Eagles (band) songs
Willie Nelson songs
Waylon Jennings songs
Suzy Bogguss songs
Etta James songs
Songs written by Glenn Frey
Songs written by Don Henley
Songs written by Randy Meisner
Rock ballads
Asylum Records singles
Columbia Records singles
Song recordings produced by Bill Szymczyk